

Helmstan was a medieval Bishop of Winchester. He was consecrated between 838 and 839. He died between 844 and 852 or in 853.

Citations

References

External links
 

Bishops of Winchester
9th-century English bishops
9th-century deaths
Year of birth unknown
Year of death uncertain